Allobates pittieri is a species of frog in the family Aromobatidae. It is endemic to northern Venezuela where it is known from the Venezuelan Coastal Range and northeastern part of the Cordillera de Mérida. Its type locality is in the Henri Pittier National Park. The species is found in humid lowland to lower montane forest, usually very near rivers and streams where it breeds.

References

pittieri
Amphibians of Venezuela
Endemic fauna of Venezuela
Taxonomy articles created by Polbot
Amphibians described in 2004